Bobby Murray (born June 9, 1953) is an American electric blues guitarist, songwriter and record producer who has played in Etta James' backing band for twenty three years, performed on three Grammy Award winning recordings with James and B.B. King and released four solo albums. In 2011, the Detroit Blues Society granted Murray their Lifetime Achievement Award. Murray currently leads his own band in Metro Detroit and has won several Detroit Music Awards. His latest solo recording, Love Letters From Detroit, was released in 2021 and was granted the Outstanding Blues Recording of the Year at the Detroit Music Awards.

His guitar playing was mainly influenced by Albert Collins and B.B. King. Murray currently resides in White Lake, Michigan, United States.

Life and career
Murray was born on a US Air Force base in Nagoya, Japan to a Japanese mother and an Irish father. Growing up in a military family, he was later raised in Tacoma, Washington. Murray attended the same high school as Robert Cray and they engaged Albert Collins to play at the school's graduation party.

Murray started his musical career playing in blues clubs in the San Francisco Bay Area, having originally formed an ensemble that became Robert Cray and the Crayolas.  Throughout the 1970s and 1980s, Murray supplied guitar backing for Frankie Lee, Sonny Rhodes, Mark Naftalin, and many others. He performed frequently with Albert Collins, Charlie Musselwhite, Otis Rush, Jimmy Witherspoon and John Lee Hooker. In 1988, Murray joined Etta James' backing ensemble, the Roots Band, performing with James for over 20 years. He also played and/or recorded with Albert King, Johnny "Guitar" Watson, Taj Mahal, Percy Mayfield, Sugar Pie DeSanto and Lowell Fulson.

He appeared on B.B. King's Grammy Award-winning album, Blues Summit, reuniting  with Robert Cray on the track, "Playing With My Friends."  Murray also played guitar on James' Grammy winning recordings, Let's Roll and Blues to the Bone. Murray's definitive style is heard on the Etta James song, "Blues is My Business" in an episode of  television drama series, The Sopranos.

Murray performed with James' Roots Band on other television programs such as The Tonight Show, Austin City Limits and Late Night with David Letterman.  Murray also played at the 1992 Summer Olympics in Barcelona, Spain, the WOMAD Festival and the inaugural celebration for President Bill Clinton.

Murray's debut album, The Blues is Now (1996), featured Frankie Lee and Freddie Hughes on vocals. The Allmusic journalist, Thom Owens, commented about Murray's work on the recording, "he's a fine guitarist, as he proves here, turning out jazzy, classy solos that separate him from the rest of the crowd." In 1999, the follow-up album, Waiting for Mr. Goodfingers..., was issued by No Cover Productions.  A live album, Live & Lowdown! was released in May 2006.

In May 2010, the Bobby Murray Band played at the Scarab Club in Detroit, Michigan.

In 2011 Murray received a Lifetime Achievement Award from the Detroit Blues Society. Murray also received Detroit Music Awards in the Outstanding Instrumentalist (Blues) and Outstanding Blues Performer/Group categories.

Murray's latest album is Love Letters From Detroit (2021).

Discography

Albums

See also
List of electric blues musicians

References

1953 births
Living people
American blues guitarists
American male guitarists
Record producers from California
Songwriters from California
Electric blues musicians
People from Nagoya
Guitarists from California
20th-century American guitarists
20th-century American male musicians
American male songwriters